Konstantin Glebovich Usov (born 9 July 1988) is a Ukrainian politician, People’s Deputy of the Verkhovna Rada of Ukraine of the VIII convocation (2014-2019), and the  member of the Kyiv City Council. Since 11 February 2021, Usov has been serving as the Deputy Head of the Kyiv City State Administration for self-governing. Until the beginning of the Russian invasion of Ukraine, he coordinated the activities of the Centers for Administrative Services (CAS), the Department of Registration of the Kyiv City State Administration, and the Department of Transport of the Kyiv City State Administration.

Biography
Konstantin Usov was born on 9 July 1988 in Kryvyi Rih into a family of engineers. At the age of thirteen he won a black belt in karate. In 2007, he started working as a correspondent for the newspaper . In 2013 he became the chairman of the Supervisory Board of the “First City TV Channel. Odesa.” In April 2014, he was appointed an adviser to the head of the Odesa Regional State Administration.

Since 2015, he has served as the Secretary of the Special Control Commission of the Verkhovna Rada of Ukraine on Privatization. From 2016, he was the Deputy Member of the Permanent Delegation of the Parliamentary Assembly of the Council of Europe and the member of the PACE’s Committee on Equality and Non-Discrimination. From 2018, Usov was the member of the PACE’s Committee on the Election of Judges to the European Court of Human Rights. Between September 2019 and February 2021, he worked as Director of Business Development and Legal Affairs at EVERLEGAL Law Firm. Since February 2021, he has been serving as the Deputy Head of the Kyiv City State Administration for self-governing.

Usov speaks Ukrainian, Russian, English and Spanish.  He is married, with two sons.

Education 
 2005 — Central City Gymnasium (Kryvyi Rih).
 2009 — Taras Shevchenko National University of Kyiv, Journalism School
 2012 — the United States Department of State’s IVLP program, “Fight Against Corruption”
 2013 — Taras Shevchenko National University of Kyiv, Law School.

Journalism career 
In 2006, Usov did an internship at the BBC News Ukrainian Service in London. He worked for “Telekrytyka,” Novyi Kanal, STB, Focusmagazine, and Dzerkalo Tyzhnia weekly newspaper. From 2007, he worked for  newspaper. From 2009, he worked as an investigative journalist for TVi. Usov's investigative reports include  “Lukianivka. Prison #1,” “Special investigation. Political Repression,” “Rent the Crowd,” “Friends of the President,” “Dikaiev’s Gang.” For some of these investigations, Usov was threatened with criminal cases.

Political career 
In 2014, Usov was elected the member of the Verkhovna Rada from Kryvyi Rih’s single district #33, being the youngest majority-elected member of the parliament of the VIII convocation.

Usov  as a Deputy Member of the Permanent Delegation to the Parliamentary Assembly of the Council of Europe. In January 2018, Konstantin Usov joined the PACE Committee on Legal Affairs and Human Rights responsible for forming the composition of the European Court. A total of 40 legal professionals are elected to the committee from among nearly a thousand PACE delegates. On 25 December 2018, Russia imposed sanctions on Usov. In the local elections of 2020 he was elected a member of the Kyiv City Council of the 9th convocation. On 9 February 2021, Vitali Klitschko, the mayor of Kyiv, appointed Usov deputy head of the Kyiv City State Administration.

Legislative activities 
In February 2016, the Verkhovna Rada introduced the draft law on Amendments to Certain Legislative Acts of Ukraine on Fighting Bribery. Under this regulation, law enforcement officials, their deputies, and other high-ranking law enforcement officials and judges who receive particularly large amounts of illegal benefits will be sentenced to life imprisonment with confiscation of property. Moreover, those sentenced to life imprisonment are not subject to amnesty under this law.

On 1 August 2017, the law on reducing the rates of excise duty on cars from Europe came into force. The largest reduction in excise duty will affect cars with engine capacity of 1-1.5 liters: by almost 22 times —down to €0.063 per 1 cm3 of engine capacity.

Konstantin Usov was directly involved in drafting of the  including the wording of Article 7 which stipulates for primary, secondary, and higher education in Ukraine in the state language.

Activities in Kryvyi Rih 
During the Usov’s tenure as MP, more than 40 city schools and kindergartens were restored, modernized, and reconstructed. In 2015–2016, Konstantin Usov together with volunteers equipped all combat vehicles of the 17th Tank Brigade from Kryvyi Rih with slat armor screens. They protect tank crewmen and the vehicles from High-explosive anti-tank shells, which penetrate the tank armor and burn everything inside. In 2018–2019, the parliamentarian installed 20 free and accessible round-the-clock fitness stations in three central districts of Kryvyi Rih, which are part of the 33rd constituency (represented by Konstantin Usov in the Verkhovna Rada).

In June 2019, Konstantin Usov said he would not run for the Verkhovna Rada of the next convocation because he did not want to be an “eternal MP.” The politician resigned as an MP and continued to work on infrastructure projects which he undertook during his time in the parliament. Upon the initiative of Usov, Hdantsivskyi Park was revived and the reconstruction of the Spartak Stadium in Kryvyi Rih is continuing.

The political website  recognized Konstantin Usov as the most responsible parliamentarian of the Dnipropetrovsk region. According to analysts, Usov has fulfilled 75 percent of his promises, one of which is currently being implemented.

Activities as Deputy Head of the Kyiv City State Administration 
Kostiantyn Usov successfully introduced significant changes into passenger transportation standards for general city routes. This caused a number of protests against him by some dissatisfied public transport operators.

Upon his initiative, Kyiv has regulated operations of rented electric scooters. Without waiting for relevant legislation to be adopted by the Verkhovna Rada, Kyiv city authorities signed a Memorandum with all operators of rented electric scooters, outlining basic rules of their operations.

Awards 
 In 2012 Usov was awarded a special prize in the professional competition “.”
 In 2012, he received the  “For progress in journalism.”

See also 
 List of members of the parliament of Ukraine, 2014–2019

References

External links 

1988 births
Living people
Politicians from Kryvyi Rih
University of Kyiv, Journalism Institute alumni
Eighth convocation members of the Verkhovna Rada
21st-century Ukrainian politicians
21st-century Ukrainian journalists
Mass media people from Kryvyi Rih